Suosan is calorie-free artificial sweetener derived from β-alanine, discovered in 1948 by  Petersen et Muller.

Suosan is a sodium salt of p-Nitrophenylcarbamidopropionic acid and is 700 times sweeter than sucrose (table sugar) with a bitter aftertaste. It was never commercialized due to its low solubility in water, particularly under acidic pH (which limited its use, particularly in soft drinks) and concerns that it might form the toxic compound 4-nitroaniline.

See also
Aspartame

References

External links

Organic sodium salts
Sugar substitutes
Ureas
Salts of carboxylic acids
Nitrobenzenes
Anilines